On December 22, 1983 an earthquake with a magnitude of 6.3 struck northern Guinea, killing around 300 people, and injuring 1,500. Around 200 people went missing.  An earthquake of this magnitude was unusual for this region of West Africa, which was previously believed by most seismologists to be aseismic. The earthquake destroyed 5,000 houses. It had an intensity of IX (Violent) on the Mercalli intensity scale, although USGS reported it as VIII (Severe). The earthquake caused cracks in the ground, and an entire cavern to collapse.

Geology
The earthquake occurred on the edge of the Paleozoic Bové Basin, near the western margin of the Precambrian West African Craton and close to the southern end of the late Proterozoic to Hercynian Mauritanide Belt.

See also

List of earthquakes in 1983
Geology of Guinea

References

Further reading
 

Earthquakes in Guinea
Earthquakes in Africa
Guinea earthquake
Earthquake
Guinea
1983 disasters in Africa